The 2011–12 QMJHL season was the 43rd season of the Quebec Major Junior Hockey League (QMJHL). The regular season, which consisted of 17 teams playing 68 games each, began in September 2011 and ended in March 2012. This season was Blainville-Boisbriand Armada's first season in the league, as the team relocated to Boisbriand from Verdun where they played as the Montreal Junior Hockey Club from 2008 to 2011. The league lost one of his charter teams when the Lewiston Maineiacs folded during after the previous season, the QMJHL later announce an expansion team to  Sherbrooke for the 2012–13 season. In the playoffs, the Saint John Sea Dogs became the seventh team in league history to capture consecutive President's Cup championships.

Regular season

Division standings

x - team has clinched playoff spot

y - team is division leader

z - team has clinched division

e - team is eliminated from playoff contention

Scoring leadersNote: GP = Games played; G = Goals; A = Assists; Pts = Points; PIM = Penalty minutesLeading goaltendersNote: GP = Games played; TOI = Total ice time; W = Wins; L = Losses ; GA = Goals against; SO = Total shutouts; SV% = Save percentage; GAA = Goals against average 2012 President's Cup playoffs 

First round

(1) Saint John Sea Dogs vs. (16) Cape Breton Screaming Eagles
 

(2) Shawinigan Cataractes vs. (15) Rouyn-Noranda Huskies
 

(3) Blainville-Boisbriand Armada vs. (14) Gatineau Olympiques

(4) Victoriaville Tigres vs. (13) Baie-Comeau Drakkar

(5) Quebec Remparts vs. (12) Drummondville Voltigeurs

(6) Halifax Mooseheads vs. (11) Moncton Wildcats

(7) Rimouski Océanic vs. (10) Val-d'Or Foreurs

(8) Chicoutimi Saguenéens vs. (9) Acadie–Bathurst Titan

Quarter-finals

(1) Saint John Sea Dogs vs. (13) Baie-Comeau Drakkar
 

(2) Shawinigan Cataractes vs. (8) Chicoutimi Saguenéens
 

(3) Blainville-Boisbriand Armada vs. (7) Rimouski Océanic
 

(5) Quebec Remparts vs. (6) Halifax Mooseheads
 

Semi-finals

(1) Saint John Sea Dogs vs. (8) Chicoutimi Saguenéens
 

(6) Halifax Mooseheads vs. (7) Rimouski Océanic
 

QMJHL Championship

(1) Saint John Sea Dogs vs. (7) Rimouski Océanic
 

Playoff scoring leadersNote: GP = Games played; G = Goals; A = Assists; Pts = Points; PIM = Penalty minutesPlayoff leading goaltendersNote: GP = Games played; Mins = Minutes played; W = Wins; L = Losses; GA = Goals Allowed; SO = Shutouts; SV& = Save percentage; GAA = Goals against average''

Memorial Cup

Trophies and awards
Team
President's Cup: Saint John Sea Dogs
Jean Rougeau Trophy - Regular Season Champions: Saint John Sea Dogs
Luc Robitaille Trophy - Team that scored the most goals: Victoriaville Tigres
Robert Lebel Trophy - Team with best GAA: Shawinigan Cataractes

Player
Michel Brière Memorial Trophy - Most Valuable Player: Yanni Gourde, Victoriaville Tigres
Jean Béliveau Trophy - Top Scorer: Yanni Gourde, Victoriaville Tigres
Guy Lafleur Trophy - Playoff MVP: Charlie Coyle, Saint John Sea Dogs
Jacques Plante Memorial Trophy - Top Goaltender: Mathieu Corbeil-Thériault, Saint John Sea Dogs
Guy Carbonneau Trophy - Best Defensive Forward: Frederick Roy, Quebec Remparts
Emile Bouchard Trophy - Defenceman of the Year: Jérôme Gauthier-Leduc, Rimouski Océanic
Kevin Lowe Trophy - Best Defensive Defenceman: Morgan Ellis, Shawinigan Cataractes
Mike Bossy Trophy - Top Prospect: Mikhail Grigorenko, Quebec Remparts
RDS Cup - Rookie of the Year: Mikhail Grigorenko, Quebec Remparts
Michel Bergeron Trophy - Offensive Rookie of the Year: Mikhail Grigorenko, Quebec Remparts
Raymond Lagacé Trophy - Defensive Rookie of the Year: Zachary Fucale, Halifax Mooseheads
Frank J. Selke Memorial Trophy - Most sportsmanlike player: Zach O'Brien, Acadie–Bathurst Titan
QMJHL Humanitarian of the Year - Humanitarian of the Year: 
Marcel Robert Trophy - Best Scholastic Player: Jonathan Brunelle, Cape Breton Screaming Eagles
Paul Dumont Trophy - Personality of the Year: Jonathan Huberdeau, Saint John Sea Dogs

Executive
Ron Lapointe Trophy - Coach of the Year: Jean-François Houle, Blainville-Boisbriand Armada
Maurice Filion Trophy - General Manager of the Year: Joël Bouchard, Blainville-Boisbriand Armada
John Horman Trophy - Executive of the Year: 
Jean Sawyer Trophy - Marketing Director of the Year:

All-Star Teams
First All-Star Team:
 Roman Will, Goaltender, Moncton Wildcats
 Jérôme Gauthier-Leduc, Defenceman, Rimouski Océanic
 Xavier Ouellet, Defenceman, Blainville-Boisbriand Armada
 Mikhail Grigorenko, Centre, Quebec Remparts
 Yanni Gourde, Left Wing, Victoriaville Tigres
 Frederick Roy, Right Wing, Quebec Remparts

Second All-Star Team:
 Mathieu Corbeil-Thériault, Goaltender, Saint John Sea Dogs
 Morgan Ellis, Defenceman, Cape Breton Screaming Eagles/Shawinigan Cataractes
 Nathan Beaulieu, Defenceman, Saint John Sea Dogs
 Zach O'Brien, Centre, Acadie–Bathurst Titan
 Jonathan Huberdeau, Left Wing, Saint John Sea Dogs
 Sébastien Trudeau, Right Wing, Acadie–Bathurst Titan

All-Rookie Team:
 Zachary Fucale, Goaltender, Halifax Mooseheads
 Nikolas Brouillard, Defenceman, Drummondville Voltigeurs
 Samuel Morin, Defenceman, Rimouski Océanic
 Mikhail Grigorenko, Centre, Quebec Remparts
 Anthony Duclair, Left Wing, Quebec Remparts
 Sven Andrighetto, Right Wing, Rouyn-Noranda Huskies

See also
 2012 Memorial Cup
 List of QMJHL seasons
 2011–12 OHL season
 2011–12 WHL season
 2011 in ice hockey
 2012 in ice hockey

References

External links
 Official QMJHL website
 Official CHL website
 Official website of the Subway Super Series

Quebec Major Junior Hockey League seasons
QMJHL